The 24th Senate District of Wisconsin is one of 33 districts in the Wisconsin State Senate.  Located in central Wisconsin, the district comprises all of Portage County and most of Wood County, as well as the northern half of Adams County, the western half of Waushara County, eastern Jackson County, and northern Monroe County.  It contains the cities of Stevens Point and Wisconsin Rapids, and the U.S. Army base Fort McCoy.

Current elected officials
Patrick Testin is the senator representing the 24th district, and is the current President pro tempore of the Wisconsin Senate. He was first elected in the 2016 general election and is now in his second four-year term.

Each Wisconsin State Senate district is composed of three Wisconsin State Assembly districts.  The 24th Senate district comprises the 70th, 71st, and 72nd Assembly districts.  The current representatives of those districts are:
 Assembly District 70: Nancy VanderMeer (R–Tomah)
 Assembly District 71: Katrina Shankland (D–Stevens Point)
 Assembly District 72: Scott Krug (R–Rome)

The 23rd Senate district crosses two congressional districts.  The portion of the district in eastern Jackson County, northeast Monroe County, and western Wood County fall within Wisconsin's 7th congressional district, which is represented by U.S. Representative Tom Tiffany; the remainder of the district in central Jackson County, northwest Monroe County, eastern Wood County, and Adams and Portage counties fall within Wisconsin's 3rd congressional district, which is represented by U.S. Representative Ron Kind.

Past senators
Previous senators include:

Note: the boundaries of districts have changed repeatedly over history. Previous politicians of a specific numbered district have represented a completely different geographic area, due to redistricting.

References

External links
District Website
Senator Lassa's Website

Wisconsin State Senate districts
Marathon County, Wisconsin
Wood County, Wisconsin
Portage County, Wisconsin
Adams County, Wisconsin
Waushara County, Wisconsin
Marquette County, Wisconsin
1852 establishments in Wisconsin